Gedaklu may refer to:
Gyodaklu (disambiguation), several towns in Armenia
Mrgavan, Armenia